Şehzade Korkut (1469 – 13 March 1513) was an Ottoman prince who was for a short time the regent for the Ottoman throne.

Early life
Although it is stated that he was born in Amasya in 1469, there is no clear record about the year of birth in the sources. He is the son of Bayezid II and Nigar Hatun. In one of his works, he writes his name as Ebülhayr Mehmed Korkut. In official documents, he used only the name Korkut. In 1479 his grandfather Mehmed II sent Korkut to Istanbul with his other brothers to be circumcised. After the death of his grandfather he was a short term regent before his father arrived at the capital. He was "the most beloved grandchild" of Sultan Mehmed, "who saw to it that Prince Korkut received the most rigorous education in his palace". He wrote six highly regarded works on religious subjects and a collection of poems, and also composed musical works.

As a governor 
According to Ottoman tradition, all princes were required to work as provincial (sanjak) governors (sanjak-bey) as a part of their training. In 1491, Korkut was appointed as the governor of Saruhan sanjak (Manisa in modern Turkey). In 1502, he was appointed as the governor of Teke (Antalya in modern Turkey), a port on the Mediterranean coast. Antalya was much farther from Istanbul than Manisa, and Korkut interpreted this appointment as a sign of disfavor by his father, the sultan. He asked for his former seat; upon refusal in 1509, he escaped to Egypt under the pretext of pilgrimage. Egypt was under Mamluk rule, and he was welcomed by the Mamluk sultans. His father considered this a sign of negligence on Korkut's part, but pardoned him, and Korkut returned to Ottoman lands. During his voyage back home, the Knights Hospitalier attacked his ship and attempted to capture him, but Korkut managed to escape from the knights and return home safely.

Beginning of the interregnum 

Beyazıt was now old and ailing. Korkut decided to move to Manisa to be closer to the capital. During this travel, a part of his treasury was raided by the rebels of Şahkulu. Later, he secretly traveled to İstanbul to have a role in the coming interregnum between his brothers. However, he found almost no supporters in the capital. He met with his brother Selim, who convinced him to return to his sanjak. Korkut then gave up all of his claims to the throne and took no part in the civil war between his two brothers (Şehzade Ahmet and Selim I).

Death 

Selim I (known as Yavuz) became the new sultan in 1512. Korkut readily accepted his brother's reign. Nevertheless, distrustful Selim decided to test his loyalty by sending him fake letters from various bureaucrats of the empire that attempted to encourage him to take part in a rebellion against Selim. Feeling that Korkut was preparing to revolt, Selim had Korkut executed in 1513 near Emet (around Kütahya in Turkey). He was buried in Bursa.

Issue  
There are no known Şehzade Korkut's concubines, but he must have had at least two, since he had two sons (For time's rule, a concubine could only have one son before being estranged by prince or Sultan's bed).

Sons  
Şehzade Korkut had two sons, both of whom died infants. The names and dates of birth and death are unknown.

Daughters  
Şehzade Korkut had at least two daughters: 
 Fatma Sultan (? -?). He married Ali Bey. 
 Ferahşad Sultan (? -?). He first married Malkocoglu Ali Bey and then in second marriage Mehmed Bey Efendi.

References 

16th-century people from the Ottoman Empire
1469 births
1513 deaths
Executed people from the Ottoman Empire
Ottoman princes
People from Amasya
16th-century executions by the Ottoman Empire
Executed royalty
Pretenders to the Ottoman throne